Pochasher is a rural locality (a village) in Yusvinskoye Rural Settlement, Yusvinsky District, Perm Krai, Russia. The population was 47 as of 2010. There is one street.

Geography 
Pochasher is located 4 km south of Yusva (the district's administrative centre) by road. Yusva is the nearest rural locality.

References 

Rural localities in Yusvinsky District